John Wilkinson is a politician in Ontario, Canada. He was a member of the Legislative Assembly of Ontario, from 2003 to 2011 representing the predominantly rural ridings of Perth—Middlesex and Perth—Wellington for the Liberal Party. He served in cabinet as Minister of Research and Innovation, Revenue and Environment. He was defeated in the 2011 election by Conservative Randy Pettapiece.

Background
Before entering public life, Wilkinson was a financial planner in Stratford. He is a certified financial planner and a founder of Wilkinson & Keller Financial Planning Ltd, he is also a former chair of the Municipal Property Assessment Corporation.  He also worked as the finance chair of his church organization for seven years. In 2002, he was awarded the Julia Award from the Canadian Cystic Fibrosis Association for his volunteer work. He is a member of the University of Waterloo Stratford Campus Advisory Board.

Politics
Wilkinson ran for the Ontario legislature in the 1999 election, losing to Progressive Conservative incumbent Bert Johnson by over 6000 votes.  In the 2003 election, he defeated Johnson by about 1500 votes in a rematch.

The Liberals won the election, and on May 21, 2004 Wilkinson was named parliamentary assistant to Leona Dombrowsky, the Minister of the Environment.

He was re-elected in the 2007 provincial election, and was named to provincial cabinet as Minister of Research and Innovation. In a cabinet shuffle on June 24, 2009, he became the province's Minister of Revenue and on August 18, 2010 became Minister of Environment.

In the 2011 election he was narrowly defeated by Conservative Randy Pettapiece by 210 votes.

Cabinet positions

Electoral record

References

External links

Living people
Members of the Executive Council of Ontario
Ontario Liberal Party MPPs
People from Stratford, Ontario
21st-century Canadian politicians
Year of birth missing (living people)